The Scottish Women's Football Championship is the third league tier of women's football in Scotland. Founded in 2020, the Championship replaced the SWFL First Division (SWFL 1). The Championship was played in North and South divisions for three seasons until 2022, when it became a single national division with eight clubs. Scottish Women's Football League One was formed in 2022 with 14 clubs (12 coming from the Championship).

League One is  the fourth tier of the women's football pyramid and is a single national division. Earlier, the level 4 tier was the SWFL Third Division (1999–2008), SWFL Second Division (2016–2019), and the SWFL (2020–2021), which is now level 5.

The Championship's first winners were Montrose (North) and Gartcairn (South). Teams can win promotion from the Championship to SWPL 2, and from League One to the Championship. No relegations are planned for 2022–23, and there is no regular relegation from League One to the SWFL, but some clubs have moved between these levels.

History
Like the SWFL First Division from 2016 to 2019, the Championship was played in North and South divisions for three seasons from 2020 to 2022. Championship North and Championship South had a total of 26 clubs. The Championship was expected to continue with Scottish Women's Football's summer calendar for its seasons (playing March–November), but that system was abandoned by the Championship and SWPL during 2020. Due to the coronavirus pandemic, the leagues switched back to winter seasons in 2020–21.

The Championship's inaugural 2020 season and 2020–21 season were both abandoned, due to the pandemic, and were declared null and void by SWF. The 2020–21 abandonment was made to allow SWF to focus on preparations for the 2021–22 season, which was completed. The divisional champions were Montrose (North) and Gartcairn (South).

A national SWF Championship division was mooted in 2021. It will come into effect in the 2022–23 season, as will League One as the fourth tier. The Championship North and South divisions will be discontinued and their clubs mainly moved into the new divisions.

Member clubs for the 2021–22 season
Clubs in the two Championship divisions:

North
Buchan
Cove Rangers
Dryburgh Athletic
Dundee West
Dunfermline Athletic
East Fife
Grampian
Inverness Caledonian Thistle
Kelty Hearts
Montrose
Stonehaven
Westdyke

South
Airdrie
Ayr United
BSC Glasgow
Clyde
Edinburgh Caledonia
Edinburgh City
Falkirk
Gartcairn
Livingston
Morton
Renfrew
St Mirren
Stenhousemuir
United Glasgow

Play-offs

The runners-up in Championship North and Championship South were intended to play-off against each other at the end of each season for a place in the promotion/relegation play-off final against the team that finished eighth in SWPL 2. Due to the uncompleted seasons in 2020 and 2020–21, the North–South play-off occurred only once, in 2021–22, but no SWPL clubs were relegated, because of the SWPL's expansion to 20 clubs. The North's East Fife beat the South division runners-up, Rossvale, 3–1 in the single-match promotion play-off in Alloa in May 2022.

Seasons

The SWF Championship kicked off in 2020, but its first two seasons were not completed.

The following clubs have been the champions of the respective divisions:

References

External links
League at Scottish Women's Football
League at women.soccerway.com

 
Championship
Third level women's association football leagues in Europe
2020 establishments in Scotland
Sports leagues established in 2020